Little Town Hero is a role-playing video game developed by Game Freak. It was first released for the Nintendo Switch in October 2019 before being ported to PlayStation 4, Xbox One and Microsoft Windows in 2020. It received mixed reviews from critics.

Gameplay

Plot

Development
Game Freak announced the game under the working title of Town in September 2018. The company shared no further information through August of the next year, when it registered a trademark. The game was released for the Nintendo Switch on October 16, 2019. The game's soundtrack was primarily written by Toby Fox, an indie developer better known for creating Undertale. In January 2020, it was announced that the game would have a retail collector's edition, published by NIS America, in June 2020. That same month, it was also announced that it would be released for the PlayStation 4 in Japan on April 23, 2020, published at retail by Rainy Frog. In addition, ports for Xbox One and Microsoft Windows were respectively released on July 2 and July 9, 2020.

Reception

Little Town Hero received mixed reviews according to review aggregator Metacritic. IGN's Tom Marks gave it a 7/10, saying "Little Town Hero exudes charm from every corner of its adorable little village, and couples that personality with an absurd and utterly unique combat system full of combos I loved discovering." GamesRadar's Jordan Gerblick gave it a 3/5, saying "An exercise in battle strategy and patience for its flaws, Little Town Hero knows where its strengths lie, and thankfully you'll see more strengths than flaws if you invest in them."

Notes

References

External links
 
 

2019 video games
Game Freak games
Nintendo Switch games
PlayStation 4 games
Role-playing video games
Video games developed in Japan
Video games scored by Toby Fox
Single-player video games
Xbox One games
Windows games